Rudolf Nussgruber (7 April 1918 – 26 July 2001) was an Austrian film director. In 1962, he co-directed the documentary film Mediterranean Holiday with Hermann Leitner and it was entered into the 3rd Moscow International Film Festival. He directed more than 30 films between 1955 and 1985.

Selected filmography
 Mediterranean Holiday (1962)
 Carl Schurz (1968, TV film)
  (1969, TV film)
 Friedrich III – Gestorben als Kaiser (1970, TV film)
 Claus Graf Stauffenberg (1970, TV film)
 General Oster – Verräter oder Patriot? (1970, TV film)
 Die U-2-Affäre (1970, TV film)
 Sacro Egoismo oder Der Bruch der Achse – Der Kriegsaustritt Italiens im Jahre 1943 (1971, TV film)
 Kaiser Karls letzte Schlacht (1971, TV film)
 Das bin ich – Wiener Schicksale aus den 30er Jahren: Österreich zwischen Demokratie und Diktatur (1972, TV film)
 Die Pueblo-Affaire (1972, TV film)
  (1972, TV film)
 Der Schuft, der den Münchhausen schrieb (1979, TV film)
 Ringstraßenpalais (1980–1986, TV series)
 August der Starke (1984, TV film)
 Ein Mann namens Parvus (1984, TV film)

References

External links

1918 births
2001 deaths
Austrian film directors
Austrian television directors
Film people from Vienna